Record Collectors Are Pretentious Assholes is hardcore punk band Poison Idea's second EP. It was released in 1985 through Fatal Erection Records.

The back cover of the album contained a picture of Elvis Presley with the words "The King" below it as a response to their previous release, the Pick Your King EP, which had a picture of Jesus on the front and Elvis on the back.

The artwork, coupled with the title, is a joke at the expense of guitarist Pig Champion, as it is a picture of his extensive record collection.

Critical reception
Trouser Press wrote that "the blind rage of songs like 'Die on Your Knees' and 'Don’t Like It Here' ... is as formidable as pre-domestication Iggy." AllMusic wrote that the EP "fine-tune[ed] the band's blistering sound and fatalistic worldview."

Track listing

Original EP
 "A.A." - 1:32
 "Legalize Freedom" - 1:44
 "Cold Comfort" - 1:14
 "Thorn In My Side" - 2:00
 "Rubber Husband" - 1:30
 "Rich Get Richer" - 1:25
 "Don't Like It Here" - 1:50
 "Time To Go" - 2:03

Reissue track list
 "A.A." - 1:32
 "Legalize Freedom" - 1:44
 "Cold Comfort" - 1:14
 "Typical" - 1:54
 "Thorn In My Side" - 2:00
 "Laughing Boy" - 1:41
 "Rubber Husband" - 1:30
 "I Gotta Right" (Iggy and the Stooges Cover) - 3:18
 "Rich Get Richer" - 1:25
 "Don't Like It Here" - 1:50
 "Die On Your Knees" - 2:45
 "Time To Go" - 2:03

Personnel
Jerry A. - Vocals
Tom "Pig Champion" Roberts - Guitar
Chris Tense - Bass
Dean Johnson - Drums

References

1984 EPs
Poison Idea albums
Record collecting